Beta Muscae, Latinized from β Muscae, is a binary star in the southern circumpolar constellation of Musca. With a combined apparent visual magnitude of 3.07, it is the second brightest star (or star system) in the constellation.

This is a binary star system with a period of about 194 years at an orbital eccentricity of 0.6. As of 2007, the two stars had an angular separation of 1.206 arcseconds at a position angle of 35°. The components are main sequence stars of similar size and appearance. The primary component, β Muscae A, has an apparent magnitude of 3.51, a stellar classification of B2 V, and about 7.35 times the Sun's mass. The secondary component, β Muscae B, has an apparent magnitude of 4.01, a stellar classification of B3 V, and is about 6.40 times the mass of the Sun.

This is a confirmed member of the Scorpius–Centaurus association, which is a group of stars with similar ages, locations, and trajectories through space, implying that they formed together in the same molecular cloud. Beta Muscae is considered a runaway star system as it has a high peculiar velocity of  relative to the normal galactic rotation. Runaway stars can be produced through several means, such as through an encounter with another binary star system. Binary systems form a relatively small fraction of the total population of runaway stars.

References

External links

B-type main-sequence stars
Binary stars
Lower Centaurus Crux

Musca (constellation)
Musca, Delta
Durchmusterung objects
110879
062322
4844